Leslie Ernest Peterson (November 4, 1928 – July 25, 2002) was a Canadian Anglican bishop in the 20th century.

Education 
Peterson was born on 4 November 1928 in Rouyn-Noranda, Quebec. He received at Bachelor of Arts degree in 1952 from the University of Western Ontario and in 1952 he earned a Licentiate in theology from Huron University College. He later went on to earn a Doctor of Sacred Theology from Thorneloe University in Sudbury, Ontario.  He was ordained as a Deacon in 1954 and as a priest 1955.

Incumbencies 
Between 1955 and 1983 he held numerous incumbencies including: 
 All Saints’ Coniston, Ontario
 St Peter's Elliot Lake
 Christ Church North Bay 
 Trinity Church Parry Sound.

Bishop 
In 1983 he became the coadjutor bishop and then the diocesan Bishop of Algoma. He resigned his see in 1994 and moved to London, Ontario for his retirement.  He died on 25 July 2002.

External links 
 Bishop Leslie E. Peterson fonds
 Anglican Diocese of Algoma

References

1928 births
University of Western Ontario alumni
Anglican bishops of Algoma
20th-century Anglican Church of Canada bishops
2002 deaths